Cristiano de Melo Araújo (January 24, 1986 – June 24, 2015) was a Brazilian singer-songwriter.

Araújo was famous for the singles "Efeitos" (2011), "Você mudou" (2012), "Maus bocados" (2013), "Cê que sabe" and "É com ela que eu estou" (both in 2014). After his album Efeitos in 2011 and live álbum/ DVD Ao Vivo em Goiânia in 2012, he released his solo studio album Continua in 2013. In 2014, he released his third live album In The Cities – Ao Vivo em Cuiabá. With most of his latest songs not making it onto a CD due to his sudden death. Araújo was signed to the Brazilian Som Livre record label.

Career

Beginnings
From early childhood in Goiás, Cristiano Araújo was influenced by sertanejo. Cristiano came from a musically inclined family, containing four generations of musicians and singers. His parents João Reis and Zenaide Melo encouraged and supported him in his conquest for a musical career and bought him his first guitar at 6 years old. By age 9, he was putting on public performances and shows. At 10 years old, he was composing songs. At age 13 he recorded his first EP and performed it during a popular Brazilian TV show, Festival do Faustão. His album was released and quickly shot up to the No. 6 spot in local "região centro oeste" (the midwest) charts. He was then offered the opportunity to include one of his songs in a popular "young talents" or "Jovens Talentos" CD, which would open chances for publicity all over the country. Again, Cristiano was still only a teenager at the time.

With sister Ana Cristina
In the years to come, Cristiano would appear on television shows and main events. At 17, he formed a duo with his twin sister Ana Cristina. For the next 6 years six years, they would record many songs and perform together. However, they failed to achieve much commercial success and were only truly known locally.

Solo career
In 2010, at age 24, Araujo decided to go solo. He had much bolder plans for his career. He began to have appearances and features with already, well-established sertanejo artists and duos in preparation for a live CD and DVD. In early 2011, he released a solo album Efeitos with appearances by Gusttavo Lima, Humberto & Ronaldo and by Jorge (from the famous duo Jorge & Mateus). With tons of great encouragement from Jorge (duo Jorge & Mateus), a long time friend, cristiano decided to follow up his newly founded popularity with a country wide tour. In the peak of the tour, he performed an average of 20 shows per month in front of large crowds and sold-out venues. Within a one-year (2011–12) he performed 117 shows.

Due to all of the newfound attention Cristiano was receiving, he ended up being invited to the culturally popular talk show Domingão do Faustão. This opened up doors for huge popular, Brazilian appearances at places such as the Sertanejo Pop Festival 2012 held in São Paulo, followed by a live album and DVD Ao Vivo em Goiânia with collaborations from well-known acts like Bruno e Marrone, Fernando & Sorocaba, Israel & Rodolffo and João Reis amongst others. 
In 2013, he released his first studio album Continua.

In 2014, he released his last DVD titled In The Cities, this being held in Cuiabá (Mato Grosso). With international standards, the DVD has a more than 40 tons of equipment structure, bringing the very latest in technology. One of the big news revealed is an application launched exclusively – a partnership between the American CIA and Hit Music – and will provide a direct interaction with the audience.  In the record of this megaespetáculo is the special participation of international artist Ian Thomas, only 17 years old.

Death
Cristiano Araújo, 29, and his girlfriend, Allana Moraes, 19, died in the early morning of June 24, 2015 when the car they were riding in veered off the road and rolled over on the highway BR-153 at km 614, between Morrinhos and Pontalina in Goiás. The accident occurred around 3:30 am, as he was returning from a show in Itumbiara when his body guard/driver lost control of the car – 2015 Range Rover Sport HSE SD V6. There have been very few details released to the public as to what actually caused the driver to be distracted. However, alcohol or falling asleep were not the factors. Speed (179 km/h on a limited to 110 km/h road), welded rims and lack of safety were factors. The driver and Araujo's manager (who was in the passenger seat) were using seat belts and suffered only minor injuries. Cristiano was sleeping upon Allana's lap and were in the back seat, without their seat belts, and were thrown out of the car causing him severe injuries and for her to be pronounced dead on scene (blunt cerebral trauma was the cause of Allana's death). Araujo had been stabilized in a municipal hospital, but he did not endure the transfer to a larger, more effective hospital – Hospital de Urgências de Goiânia (Hugo) – and was pronounced dead upon arrival at the trauma center.

The wake was on the same day of his passing and was public, so fans could pay respects and mourn. Both were buried the following day in the same cemetery.

Discography

Albums
Studio albums

Live albums

Singles

Featured in

Promotional songs

Other appearances

Tours
2011–2012: Efeitos Tour
2013–2014: Continua Tour
2014: In The USA Tour
2014: Europe Tour
2014–2015: In The Cities Tour

References

External links

1986 births
2015 deaths
21st-century Brazilian male singers
21st-century Brazilian singers
People from Goiânia
Road incident deaths in Brazil
Sertanejo musicians
Brazilian twins